Alan Chipp (born 9 January 1937) is a former Australian rules footballer who played for the Fitzroy Football Club in the Victorian Football League (VFL). He is a younger brother of politician Don Chipp.

Notes

External links 
		

1937 births
Living people
Australian rules footballers from Victoria (Australia)
Fitzroy Football Club players